Bertram Williams (18 December 1876 – 24 January 1934) was a Canadian sports shooter. He competed at the 1908 Summer Olympics winning a bronze medal in the team military rifle event.

References

1876 births
1934 deaths
Canadian male sport shooters
Olympic shooters of Canada
Shooters at the 1908 Summer Olympics
Olympic bronze medalists for Canada
Olympic medalists in shooting
Medalists at the 1908 Summer Olympics
Sportspeople from Nova Scotia
20th-century Canadian people